Jain Irrigation Systems, or Jains, is an Indian multinational conglomerate based in Jalgaon. It develops, manufactures, supports and sells diversified products, including drip and sprinkler irrigation systems and its components, integrated irrigation automation systems for monitoring and control, dosing systems, PVC and PE piping systems, plastic sheets, greenhouses, bio-fertilizers, solar power, solar water-heating systems, solar water pumps, turnkey biogas plants, photovoltaic systems and tissue culture plants. JISL also processes dehydrated vegetables, spices, concentrated & frozen fruits or pulp. It also provides turnkey projects and agronomical support services.

The company ranked 7th on the Fortune's ‘Change the World’ list as of 2015. It employs over 12,000 employees, 11,000 Dealers and Distributors and has 33 manufacturing plants worldwide.

Mergers and acquisitions
Jain Irrigation Systems Ltd. emerged as one big company after merging with various Jain Group Companies, such as Jain Plastic & Chemicals Ltd., Jain Kemira Fertilizers Ltd., Jain Rahan Biotech Ltd, Jain Brothers Industries, Anubhuti School, and Jain Pipe.  Jain continued acquiring companies to expand its business penetration. After some big acquisitions it became currently second-largest irrigation company and third-largest dehydrated onion producer in the world.

JISL then acquired Tera Agro Technologies and the mango-processing division of Parle-Bisleri Pvt. Ltd., both located in India. After this and similar other acquisitions, JISL became the largest processor of fruits & vegetables within India and the biggest mango pulp processor in the organised sector of the world.

2006-2012
 2006: JISL acquired Chapin Watermatic, Pioneer of Drip Irrigation Systems concept in United States.
 2006: JISL acquired NuCedar Mills, a US company in the custom homebuilding market.
 December 2006 – JISL acquired a majority stake in the US-based Cascade Specialties, Inc., which specialises in natural low-bacteria onion products and organic dehydrated onion. With this acquisition, Jain Irrigation became the third-largest dehydrated onion producer in the world, with a combined capacity in excess of 25, 000 MTS.
 February 2007 – By acquiring the US-based Aquarius Brands for $21. 5 million in an all-cash deal, Jain Irrigation became the second-largest drip irrigation company in the world.
 June 2007 – Jain Irrigation Acquired 50. 001% stake in NAANDAN. Following the transaction, which includes a US$30 million investment, NaanDan and Jain intend to become the largest irrigation company worldwide within the next few years .
 November 2010 – By acquiring controlling stake in Sleaford Quality Foods Limited ("SQFL" or "Sleaford Quality Foods"), a UK-based Industrial Food Ingredients Supplier Jain Irrigation got direct access to a large market with value added products with this acquisition. Now it is part of its subsidiary Jain Farm Fresh Ltd.
 May 2012 – Jain acquired the remaining 50% of NaanDanJain Ltd. from Kibbutz Na'an in Israel for an estimated $35 million.

2013-2020
 2018: Jain acquired ET Water Systems, "a California, US-based company that offers irrigation technology product."

History and growth

Early history 

 1887–1963: Jain Irrigation's roots in the fields of agriculture, water, and food started in 1887 when its founder's forefathers left the deserts of Rajasthan, their home state, in search of water and food and reached Wakod, at the foothills of the Ajanta Caves. They started farming as a means of livelihood.

In 1963, selling kerosene from a pushcart, a young law graduate Bhavarlal Jain, founded a business. The family formed a partnership with  7, 000, an accumulated savings of three generations, as capital. Soon, agencies for two-wheelers, auto vehicles, and automobile accessories were established.

 1963–1978: Bhavarlal Jain added a dealership of tractors, sprinkler systems, PVC pipes, and other farm equipment. In order to broad-base the business, agencies for farm inputs such as fertilizers, seeds, and pesticides were also added. Sales grew from  1 million in 1963 to  110 million in 1978.
 1978: Jain took over a 14-year-old sick banana powder plant in April 1978 at a high auction price of  3 million while only  0. 2 million as inevitable surplus. The plant was modified for the production of papain from papaya latex. In December 1978, the founder traveled to New York in search of customers for Jain papain. The competition for purchase of raw materials at home and for sale of papain abroad was stiff and stifling. However, Jain developed purified papain through ceaseless in-house R&D and emerged as the number-one supplier of the highest purity refined papain.
 1980: Manufacturing of PVC Pipe commenced with a small annual capacity of 300 MTs which was increased to over 35, 600 MTs per annum by 1997. This made Jain the largest single producer of PVC pipe in India. Further Jain expanded the range to casing & screen piping systems.

Growth (1989 – ) 

 1989: Beginning in 1989, Jain Irrigation worked to develop water management through micro-irrigation in India. Jain Irrigation has introduced some high-tech concepts to Indian agriculture, such as the integrated system approach, one-stop-shop for farmers requirements, and infrastructure status to micro-irrigation & farm as industry.
 1994: Jain diversified into food processing and set up facilities vegetable dehydration and the production of fruit purees, concentrates, and pulp. This facility adopting ISO 9001 & HACCP certified and international FDA statute requirements. This facility will help combine the modern technologies of the west with the vast, mostly untapped agriculture resources of India, using local human resources.
 2002 – : After being caught between severe liquidity crunch, making lot of loss and mounting pressure from the banks and financial institutions to immediately clear overdue liabilities, Jain Irrigation Systems Ltd. (JISL) has decided to raise funds by way of offering majority equity holding in the company in favour of Aqua International Partners LP. JISL were out from a bad financial patch of 4 years and start growing rapidly. Its net profit were more than doubled from Rs 324  million in fiscal 2004–05 to Rs 671. 7  million in fiscal 2005–06. Exports have contributed Rs 2. 89  billion to Jain's overall revenue.
 2005 – : Jain started producing individually quick-frozen (IQF) food products like frozen mango slices in agreement with the Taiyo Kagaku Company Ltd, Japan.
 2006 – : After continued acquisitions, Jain became the second-largest irrigation company and third-largest dehydrated onion producer in the world. It also became the largest processor of fruits & vegetables within India.
 2012 - : Gandhi Research Foundation (GRF), inaugurated by President of India, Pratibha Patil on 25 March 2012. Sponsored by Jain Irrigation and Bhavarlal Kantabai Foundation. The Foundation is the initiator and promoter of ‘Gandhi Teerth’, an international centre for Gandhian study, research and dialogue. Its core objective is to preserve and promote for posterity the Gandhian ideology and legacy. 'Gandhi Teerth' comprises Gandhi museum, Gandhi International Research Institute, Gandhi archives, publications, and various programmes for rural development based on Gandhian lines. The foundation has a collection of 7350 books, 4090 periodicals, 4019 photographs, 75 films, 148 audio recordings of Mahatma Gandhi's speeches, and philately items from 114 countries.
 2016 – : Jain Irrigation's food division has been hived off into a Subsidiary Company Jain Farm Fresh Foods Ltd, which were in the food processing business since 1994 making fruit pulps of mango, banana, guava, strawberry and dehydrated vegetables. Jain Farm Fresh Foods Ltd launched its first branded retail product 'AamRus' under the umbrella brand name of 'Jain FarmFresh'.  'AamRus', processed from Alphonso and Kesar varieties, is sweetened frozen mango pulp with no added flavour and colour.

Corporate rankings 

 Jain Irrigation Systems Ltd (JISL) in 2005 ranked 100th on the list of conglomerates in Maharashtra.
 Standard & Poor's identifies Jain Irrigation Systems Ltd. among list of 300 world-beaters.
 In 2011, the World Economic Forum listed JISL as one of the 15 "Sustainability Champions".

References

External links 

 
 World’S Largest Plastic Pipe Mosaic Portrait World Record set by Jain Irrigation Systems

Manufacturing companies established in 1989
Irrigation in India
Companies based in Maharashtra
Agriculture companies of India
Jalgaon
Indian brands
Indian companies established in 1989
1989 establishments in Maharashtra
Irrigation companies
Companies listed on the National Stock Exchange of India
Companies listed on the Bombay Stock Exchange